Björn Kristjánsson, known professional as Borko, is an Icelandic musician. His debut album Celebrating Life was released in March 2008 on record labels Morr Music and Kimi Records. Borko and band toured with the Icelandic bands Múm, FM Belfast and Seabear. Now he is a teacher in Laugalækjarskóli.

Discography
Celebrating Life (2008)
Born to Be Free (2012)

References

External links
Borko at MySpace
Morr Music
Kimi Records
 Acoustic Session with 'They Shoot Music - Don't They'

Icelandic musicians
Living people
Year of birth missing (living people)
Morr Music artists